The 1910 Utah Agricultural Aggies football team was an American football team that represented Utah Agricultural College (later renamed Utah State University) as an independent during the 1910 college football season. In their second season under head coach Clayton Teetzel, the Aggies compiled a 5–2 record and outscored opponents by a total of 104 to 33.

Schedule

References

Utah Agricultural
Utah State Aggies football seasons
Utah State Aggies football